Oscar Ingolfur Asmundson (November 17, 1908 – November 2, 1964)  was a Canadian ice hockey right winger who played six seasons in the National Hockey League. Asmundson won the Stanley Cup as a member of the New York Rangers] in 1933. He was born in Markerville, Alberta, but grew up in Red Deer, Alberta. During World War II he competed with the United States Coast Guard Cutters hockey team. He also played several years in the minor leagues, primarily in the International American Hockey League/American Hockey League, and retired in 1945.

Career statistics

Regular season and playoffs

External links

1908 births
1964 deaths
Bronx Tigers players
Burials at Los Angeles National Cemetery
Canadian expatriate ice hockey players in the United States
Canadian ice hockey right wingers
Canadian people of Scandinavian descent
Cleveland Barons (1937–1973) players
Detroit Olympics (IHL) players
Detroit Red Wings players
Ice hockey people from Alberta
Montreal Canadiens players
New Haven Eagles players
New York Americans players
New York Rangers players
Philadelphia Rockets players
Providence Reds players
St. Louis Eagles players
Sportspeople from Red Deer, Alberta
Stanley Cup champions
United States Coast Guard Cutters players
United States Coast Guard personnel of World War II
Victoria Cubs players
Vancouver Lions players
Washington Lions players
20th-century Canadian people